The Citadel is a mountain in South West Tasmania. It lies on the north east end of the Frankland Range jutting out towards the east from the range towards the impoundment Lake Pedder. It is directly south of The Lion and west of Murpheys Bluff. It forms the south eastern border of The Moat, an alpine lake.

See also
 Lake Pedder
 Strathgordon, Tasmania
 South West Wilderness, Tasmania

References
 Solitary 4224, Edition 1 2001, Tasmania 1:25000 Series, Tasmap

Mountains of Tasmania
South West Tasmania